The 2020 New York Mets season was the franchise's 59th season and the team's 12th season at Citi Field. The team hired Carlos Beltrán to be their manager in November 2019, however in the wake of the Houston Astros sign stealing scandal, on January 16, 2020, Beltrán and the Mets agreed to part ways. On January 24, 2020, Luis Rojas was hired as the Mets manager. The season is also the last season to have Fred Wilpon as the team's majority owner before being sold to billionaire hedge fund manager Steve Cohen.

On March 12, 2020, MLB announced that because of the ongoing COVID-19 pandemic, the start of the regular season would be delayed by at least two weeks in addition to the remainder of spring training being cancelled. Four days later, it was announced that the start of the season would be pushed back indefinitely due to the recommendation made by the CDC restricting large public events. On June 23, commissioner Rob Manfred unilaterally implemented a 60-game season. Players reported to training camps on July 1 in order to resume spring training and prepare for a July 24 Opening Day.

On September 23, the team suffered its 31st loss, sealing their third losing season in four years. On September 26, the Mets were eliminated from playoff contention in a 4–3 loss to the Washington Nationals, continuing a four-year-long playoff drought. The Mets finished the regular season 26–34, giving them a last place finish as a result of a 4–6 record against the Washington Nationals, who also went 26–34. This was the first season since 2003 where the Mets finished last place in the NL East.

The Mets led MLB in batting average (.272) and OPS+ (122), however they also grounded into the most double plays (53, tied with the Milwaukee Brewers) and had the most runners left on base (445).

Offseason

Transactions

2019
 December 12 – Rick Porcello signs with the Mets for $10 million for one-year.
 December 13 – Michael Wacha signs with the Mets after reaching a one-year, $3 million deal which includes $8 million in performance bonuses.
 December 24 – Dellin Betances signs with the Mets for a one-year, $10.5 million deal.

Season standings

National League East

National League Division Leaders

Record vs. opponents

Game log

Regular season 
On April 28–30, the Mets were supposed to play against the Miami Marlins in the Puerto Rico Series in San Juan. But due to the pandemic, MLB canceled the Series.

|- style="background:#cfc;"
| 1 || July 24 || Braves || 1–0 || Lugo (1–0) || Martin (0–1) || Díaz (1) || Citi Field || 1–0
|- style="background:#fbb;"
| 2 || July 25 || Braves || 3–5  || Jackson (1–0) || Strickland (0–1) || — || Citi Field || 1–1
|- style="background:#fbb;"
| 3 || July 26 || Braves || 1–14 || Chacín (1–0) || Porcello (0–1) || — || Citi Field || 1–2
|- style="background:#cfc;"
| 4 || July 27 || @ Red Sox || 7–4 || Wacha (1–0) || Osich (0–1) || Lugo (1) || Fenway Park || 2–2
|- style="background:#cfc;"
| 5 || July 28 || @ Red Sox || 8–3 || Peterson (1–0) || Hall (0–1) || — || Fenway Park || 3–2
|- style="background:#fbb;"
| 6 || July 29 || Red Sox || 5–6 || Hembree (1–0) || Wilson (0–1) || Workman (1) || Citi Field || 3–3
|- style="background:#fbb;"
| 7 || July 30 || Red Sox || 2–4 || Pérez (1–1) || Matz (0–1) || Workman (2) || Citi Field || 3–4
|- style="background:#fbb;"
| 8 || July 31 || @ Braves || 10–11 || Dayton (1–0) || Lugo (1–1) || Martin (1) || Truist Park || 3–5
|-

|- style="background:#fbb;"
| 9 || August 1 || @ Braves || 1–7 || Tomlin (1–0) || Wacha (1–1) || — || Truist Park || 3–6
|- style="background:#fbb;"
| 10 || August 2 || @ Braves || 0–4 || Matzek (1–0) || Peterson (1–1) || — || Truist Park || 3–7
|- style="background:#cfc;"
| 11 || August 3 || @ Braves || 7–2 || deGrom (1–0) || Soroka (0–1) || — || Truist Park || 4–7
|- style="background:#fbb;"
| 12 || August 4 || @ Nationals || 3–5 || Corbin (1–0) || Matz (0–2) || Hudson (2) || Nationals Park || 4–8
|- style="background:#cfc;"
| 13 || August 5 || @ Nationals || 3–1 || Porcello (1–1) || Fedde (0–1) || Lugo (2) || Nationals Park || 5–8
|- style="background:#fbb;"
| 14 || August 7 || Marlins || 3–4 || Tarpley (2–0) || Wacha (1–2) || Vincent (1) || Citi Field || 5–9
|- style="background:#cfc;"
| 15 || August 8 || Marlins || 8–4 || Peterson (2–1) || Castano (0–1) || — || Citi Field || 6–9
|- style="background:#cfc;"
| 16 || August 9 || Marlins || 4–2 || deGrom (2–0) || López (1–1) || Lugo (3) || Citi Field || 7–9
|- style="background:#fbb;"
| 17 || August 10 || Nationals || 4–16 || Corbin (2–0) || Matz (0–3) || — || Citi Field || 7–10
|- style="background:#fbb;"
| 18 || August 11 || Nationals || 1–2 || Scherzer (1–1) || Porcello (1–2) || Hudson (3) || Citi Field || 7–11
|- style="background:#cfc;"
| 19 || August 12 || Nationals || 11–6 || Familia (1–0) || Sánchez (0–3) || — || Citi Field || 8–11
|- style="background:#cfc;"
| 20 || August 13 || Nationals || 8–2 || Peterson (3–1) || Voth (0–2) || — || Citi Field || 9–11
|- style="background:#fbb;"
| 21 || August 14 || @ Phillies || 5–6 || Neris (1–0) || Lugo (1–2) || — || Citizens Bank Park || 9–12
|- style="background:#fbb;"
| 22 || August 15 || @ Phillies || 2–6 || Nola (2–1) || Matz (0–4) || — || Citizens Bank Park || 9–13
|- style="background:#fbb;"
| 23 || August 16 || @ Phillies || 2–6 || Wheeler (3–0) || Porcello (1–3) || — || Citizens Bank Park || 9–14
|- style="background:#cfc;"
| 24 || August 17 || @ Marlins || 11–4 || Shreve (1–0) || Yamamoto (0–1) || Kilome (1) || Marlins Park || 10–14
|- style="background:#cfc;"
| 25 || August 18 || @ Marlins || 8–3 || Wilson (1–1) || Mejía (0–1) || — || Marlins Park || 11–14
|- style="background:#cfc;"
| 26 || August 19 || @ Marlins || 5–3 || Díaz (1–0) || Kintzler (1–2) || — || Marlins Park || 12–14
|- style="background:#bbb;"
| — || August 20 || @ Marlins || colspan=7 | Postponed (COVID-19); Makeup: Aug 25  
|- style="background:#bbb;"
| — || August 21 || Yankees || colspan=7 | Postponed (COVID-19); Makeup: Aug 28
|- style="background:#bbb;"
| — || August 22 || Yankees || colspan=7 | Postponed (COVID-19); Makeup: Aug 30
|- style="background:#bbb;"
| — || August 23 || Yankees ||colspan=7 | Postponed (COVID-19); Makeup: Sep 3
|- style="background:#fbb;"
| 27 || August 25 || Marlins || 0–4  || Bleier (1–0) || Porcello (1–4) || — || Citi Field || 12–15
|- style="background:#fbb;"
| 28 || August 25 || @ Marlins || 0–3  || Smith (1–0) || Hughes (0–1) || Vincent (2) || Citi Field || 12–16
|- style="background:#cfc;"
| 29 || August 26 || Marlins || 5–4 || Brach (1–0) || Vincent (1–2) || — || Citi Field || 13–16
|- style="background:#bbb;"
| — || August 27 || Marlins || colspan=7 | Postponed (strikes due to shooting of Jacob Blake); Makeup: August 31 
|- style="background:#cfc;"
| 30 || August 28 || @ Yankees || 6–4 || Lockett (1–0) || Green (2–2) || Díaz (2) || Yankee Stadium || 14–16
|- style="background:#cfc;"
| 31 || August 28 || Yankees || 4–3 || Hughes (1–1) || Chapman (0–1) || — || Yankee Stadium || 15–16
|- style="background:#fbb;"
| 32 || August 29 || @ Yankees || 1–2 || Chapman (1–1) || Betances (0–1) || — || Yankee Stadium || 15–17
|- style="background:#fbb;"
| 33 || August 30 || @ Yankees || 7–8  || Green (3–2) || Díaz (1–1) || — || Yankee Stadium || 15–18
|- style="background:#fbb;"
| 34 || August 30 || Yankees || 2–5  || Holder (1–0) || Smith (0–1) || Cessa (1) || Yankee Stadium || 15–19
|- style="background:#fbb;"
| 35 || August 31 || Marlins || 3–5 || Rogers (1–0) || deGrom (2–1) || Kintzler (7) || Citi Field || 15–20
|-

|- style="background:#fbb;"
| 36 || September 1 || @ Orioles || 5–9 || Eshelman (3–0) || Kilome (0–1) || — || Camden Yards || 15–21
|- style="background:#cfc;"
| 37 || September 2 || @ Orioles || 9–4 || Peterson (4–1) || Means (0–3) || — || Oriole Park at Camden Yards|Camden Yards || 16–21
|- style="background:#cfc;"
| 38 || September 3 || Yankees || 9–7  || Díaz (2–1) || Abreu (0–1) || — || Citi Field || 17–21
|- style="background:#fbb;"
| 39 || September 4 || Phillies || 3–5 || Arrieta (3–4) || Hughes (1–2) || Workman (9) || Citi Field || 17–22
|- style="background:#cfc;"
| 40 || September 5 || Phillies || 5–1 || Lugo (2–2) || Howard (1–2) || — || Citi Field || 18–22
|- style="background:#cfc;"
| 41 || September 6 || Phillies || 14–1 || deGrom (3–1) || Nola (4–3) || — || Citi Field || 19–22
|- style="background:#fbb;"
| 42 || September 7 || Phillies || 8–9  || Workman (1–1) || Castro (1–1) || Neris (3) || Citi Field || 19–23
|- style="background:#fbb;"
| 43 || September 8 || Orioles || 2–11 || Means (1–3) || Wacha (1–3) || — || Citi Field || 19–24
|- style="background:#cfc;"
| 44 || September 9 || Orioles || 7–6 || Familia (2–0) || Harvey (0–1) || Díaz (3) || Citi Field || 20–24
|- style="background:#cfc;"
| 45 || September 11 || @ Blue Jays || 18–1 || deGrom (4–1) || Anderson (0–1) || Ramírez (1) || Sahlen Field || 21–24
|- style="background:#fbb;"
| 46 || September 12 || @ Blue Jays || 2–3 || Ray (2–4) || Lugo (2–3) || Dolis (4) || Sahlen Field || 21–25
|- style="background:#fbb;"
| 47 || September 13 || @ Blue Jays || 3–7 || Ryu (4–1) || Peterson (4–2) || — || Sahlen Field || 21–26
|- style="background:#fbb;"
| 48 || September 15 || @ Phillies || 1–4 || Arrieta (4–4) || Porcello (1–5) || Neris (4) || Citizens Bank Park || 21–27
|- style="background:#cfc;"
| 49 || September 16 || @ Phillies || 5–4 || Castro (2–1) || Neris (2–2) || Díaz (4) || Citizens Bank Park || 22–27
|- style="background:#cfc;"
| 50 || September 17 || @ Phillies || 10–6 || Wilson (2–1) || Workman (1–3) || — || Citizens Bank Park || 23–27
|- style="background:#fbb;"
| 51 || September 18 || Braves || 2–15 || Fried (7–0) || Matz (0–5) || — || Citi Field || 23–28
|- style="background:#cfc;"
| 52 || September 19 || Braves || 7–2 || Peterson (5–2) || Anderson (3–1) || — || Citi Field || 24–28
|- style="background:#fbb;"
| 53 || September 20 || Braves || 0–7 || Wright (2–4) || Porcello (1–6) || — || Citi Field || 24–29
|- style="background:#fbb;"
| 54 || September 21 || Rays || 1–2 || Fleming (4–0) || deGrom (4–2) || Anderson (6) || Citi Field || 24–30
|- style="background:#cfc;"
| 55 || September 22 || Rays || 5–2 || Lugo (3–3) || Snell (4–2) || Díaz (5) || Citi Field || 25–30
|- style="background:#fbb;"
| 56 || September 23 || Rays || 5–8 || Glasnow (5–1) || Wacha (1–4) || — || Citi Field || 25–31
|- style="background:#cfc;"
| 57 || September 24 || @ Nationals || 3–2 || Peterson (6–2) || Corbin (2–7) || Díaz (6) || Nationals Park || 26–31
|- style="background:#bbb;"
| – || September 25 || @ Nationals || colspan=7 |Postponed (rain); Makeup: September 26 as part of a doubleheader
|- style="background:#fbb;"
| 58 || September 26 || @ Nationals || 3–4  || Scherzer (5–4) || Castro (2–2) || Harris (1) || Nationals Park || 26–32
|- style="background:#fbb;"
| 59 || September 26 || @ Nationals || 3–5  || Sánchez (4–5) || Porcello (1–7) || Hudson (10) || Nationals Park || 26–33
|- style="background:#fbb;"
| 60 || September 27 || @ Nationals || 5–15 || Voth (2–5) || Lugo (3–4) || — || Nationals Park || 26–34
|-

|- style="text-align:center;"
| Legend:       = Win       = Loss       = PostponementBold = Mets team member

Roster

Farm system

References

External links
 2020 New York Mets season at Baseball Reference

New York Mets seasons
New York Mets season
New York Mets
2020s in Queens
Flushing, Queens